Koli is also known as Koliya in ancient India. 
Mahawar also known as Mahor and spelled as Mahaur, Mahour and Mahavar is a sub-caste of the Koli caste in the Indian states of Rajasthan, Delhi, Punjab, Haryana, Uttar Pradesh and Madhya Pradesh. Mahawar kolis Inter-marry with Shakya kolis but not with any other subcaste of Kolis. The Mahawar kolis along with other Koli subcastes Shakyawar, Jaiswar, Kabirpanthi ( who followed the Kabir Panth) and Shankhwar kolis of Uttar Pradesh tried to uplift the social status in Hindu society by supporting the 'All India Kshatriya Koli Mahasabha' leaders of Ajmer.

All India Kshatriya Koli Mahasabha 
All India Kshatriya Koli Mahasabha or Akhil Bhartiya Kshatriya Koli Mahasabha was a social organisation initiated in Ajmer by Mahawar Kolis of Rajasthan in 1927 and spread throughout the Uttar Pradesh, Madhya Pradesh and Rajasthan. The organization was created to raise awareness about the social and economic problems faced by Kolis and improve the social status as a Kshatriya caste. Koli leaders of Mahasabha claimed Kshatriya status because of the Koli Princely states and Jagirs of Kolis in Gujarat, Maharashtra and Himachal Pradesh. At that time, there were 52 princely states of Kolis in Gujarat but all of them were minor or petty states, several of Koli principalities were in Maharashtra and Kullu state in Himachal.

After the Independence of India from British rule in 1947, the leaders of Mahasabha in 1952 invited the Koli Maharaja Yashwantrao Martandrao Mukne of Jawhar state, Maharaja Deshmukh Dhairyashilrao Pawar of Surgana state and the Koli Thakurs of Jagirs in Gujarat to take a meeting in Ajmer to discuss the upliftment of Koli society. Maharaja Mukne sent his Prime Minister to the meeting with grateful thanks.

Origin 
The origin of the Mahawar subgroup of Kolis is unclear, there are two myths about Mahawar Kolis, firstly is that Mahawars got their name from Marwad of Rajasthan and after the defeat of Marwad Kingdom against Muslim invaders, Kolis adopted the Mahawar name to retained the origin of soil. But here are another second myth that Mahawar Kolis got their name from their legendary king Maharaja Mawar Dev who ruled over some parts of Rajputana (now Rajasthan) and Madhya Pradesh.

Clans 
Mahawar Kolis have a number of clans in several states, some of them mentioned here;
 Attri
 Attrish
 Bhukkal
 Badgurjar
 Bhumaria
 Hada
 Chauhan
 Rathod
 Suryawanshi
 Yaduvanshi
 Kashyap
 Parihar
 Dagar
 Gulia
 Rawat
 Gehlot
 Kachhwai
 Bais

Classification 
Mahawar Kolis are classified as Scheduled Caste of State Government of Rajasthan. Mahawar kolis were placed in SC category during the rule of Indian National Congress party in 1976, Before 1976, they were classified as Other Backward Class.

See also 
 List of Koli people
 List of Koli states and clans
 Mahawar Vaishya

References 

Social groups of Rajasthan
Koli people
Koli subcastes